LASER Airlines (legally and officially Línea Aérea de Servicio Ejecutivo Regional, C.A.) is an airline based in Caracas, Venezuela.  It operates scheduled and passenger charter services within Venezuela, the Caribbean, and South America. Its main hub is Simón Bolívar International Airport.

History
The airline was established in 1993 and started operations in 1994. At the beginning, the company had one Douglas DC-9-14, and only the following year purchased a Boeing 727-200, and began to expand domestic and international destinations, becoming one of Venezuela’s main airlines .

After the outbreak of the Venezuelan crisis in 2014, due to the embargo sanctions imposed by the United States, some of LASER’s international routes were changed to origin and end at the Las Americas International Airport in Dominican Republic to ensure that relevant routes continue to operate.

LASER Airlines began to fly to Miami in an alliance with World Atlantic Airlines, which has been a partner since November 2016, an alliance was established through which the Miami-Caracas flight was created on a daily basis. A second frequency was added to this frequency by partnering with Swift Air to offer greater comfort to passengers on both frequencies, it was possible to expand the baggage allowance and operate 2 classes. Both are operated with equipment of Boeing 737s, thus dissolving the alliance with World Atlantic. Subsequently, due to the decision taken by the United States Government, on May 15, 2019, commercial and cargo flights to Venezuela from the United States were suspended indefinitely. Due to this, LASER created a hub at Las Americas International Airport, adding an additional frequency to this destination, leaving 2 daily frequencies and with the possibility of connecting to Miami, maintaining the alliance with Swift Air.

On December 1, 2019, LASER was forced to cancel its Caracas-Guayaquil route due to complex migratory demands by the Government of Ecuador for Venezuelans; But a few weeks later, it announced a new route to Caracas-Bogotá with a daily frequency that began operating on February 10, 2020.

In 2020, LASER formed a subsidiary low-cost airline named RED Air, under a joint venture with a Dominican corporation, SERVAIR.

Destinations

, LASER operates services to the following domestic and international scheduled destinations:

Codeshare agreements
Plus Ultra Líneas Aéreas

Fleet

Current fleet
, LASER Airlines consists of the following aircraft:

Former fleet
LASER Airlines had in the past operated the following aircraft:

Accidents and incidents
On March 17, 2014, a McDonnell Douglas MD-82 (registered YV2945) flying from Porlamar to Valencia with 96 people on board, burst both nose gear tires while landing at Arturo Michelena International Airport and came to a stop on the runway with the tires and both nose wheels damaged, and was disabled. No injuries occurred.

On May 25, 2021, a McDonnell Douglas MD-83 (registered YV3465) made an emergency landing after a failure in the left engine, the crew reported that a bird strike caused the failure. The aircraft landed back safely at Simón Bolívar International Airport and all 116 on board were uninjured.

See also
List of airlines of Venezuela

References

External links

Official website

Airlines of Venezuela
Airlines established in 1993
Venezuelan brands
Venezuelan companies established in 1993